Rugmini is a 1989 Indian Malayalam film, directed by KP Kumaran, starring Nedumudi Venu and Anju in the lead roles. Kumaran won the Kerala State Film Award for Best Director for the film.

Cast
 Nedumudi Venu
 Anju 
 Innocent	
 Ashokan	
 Sreenivasan	
 Mavelikkara Ponnamma

References

External links
 

1989 films
1980s Malayalam-language films